Hill of Fearn is a small village near Tain in Easter Ross, in the Scottish council area of Highland.

Geography
The village is on the B9165 road, between the A9 trunk road and the smaller hamlet of Fearn to the southeast. The parish church of Fearn Abbey stands a few minutes walk to the south-east of the village. Coincidentally, one of its Abbots, Abbot Finlay McFaed (d.1485) almost shares his unusual surname with the present renovator and owner of Balnagown Castle (Seat of the Clan Ross, 10 minutes drive to the southwest) - Mohamed Al Fayed.

The former RNAS Fearn (HMS Owl) is to the south of the village.

Village
Hill of Fearn has a post office which doubles as the village shop and butchers, a primary school and a bus stop.

The "N" on the sign into the village is often removed, giving the village the more sinister title of "Hill of Fear" - despite the best efforts of  Highland Council to replace the N, or the entire sign itself, on a number of occasions.

The name Fearn, according to Watson's "Place Names of Ross & Cromarty", derives from the Scottish Gaelic Feàrna (an alder tree).

Famous residents
Hill of Fearn was the birthplace (28 August 1884) of the New Zealand Prime Minister Peter Fraser (1 April 1940 to 13 December 1949).

Hill of Fearn was also the birthplace (14 May 1948) of churchman John MacLeod.

The author Eric Linklater (1899–1974), when he was owner of nearby Pitcalzean House, Nigg in the 1940s and 1950s bought his clothes from the village tailor, Norman Smart.

See also
 Fearn railway station

References

External links
 Fearn Peninsula
 Tain Through Time
 Tain community website
 Aldie Watermill & Tain Pottery
 Anta Pottery
 Pitcalzean House
 Fearn Aerodrome
 Tarbat Discovery Centre

Populated places in Ross and Cromarty